Philadelphia Temple of Hemp and Cannabis (also called Philly THC) is a church in Philadelphia, Pennsylvania.

The church interior features Rastafarian images, including a mural of Haile Selassie.

It may be the first space for public consumption of cannabis in America east of the Missisippi River, following "a handful" in Denver and San Francisco around 2019. It may circumvent the state's laws against public smoking by offering "ceramic-tipped electronic devices" for consumption via dry herb vaporizer on premises.

The venue has held other public events such as a public reading of Cannabis: The Illegalization of Weed in America by its author, Box Brown.

References

Sources

Further reading

2019 establishments in Pennsylvania
2019 in cannabis
Cannabis and religion
Cannabis in Pennsylvania
Churches in Philadelphia
New religious movements
Religious organizations established in 2019
Religious organizations using entheogens